Abraham V. M is C.M.I. priest and academician he served as the vice-chancellor of Christ University from 2019 to 2023. He was the former Pro-Vice-Chancellor of Christ University for the past 10 years.

References

External links 
 

Year of birth missing (living people)
Living people
Indian academic administrators
Heads of universities and colleges in India